The brown-backed needletail (Hirundapus giganteus), or brown needletail, is a large swift.

These birds have very short legs which they use only mainly for clinging to vertical surfaces. They never settle voluntarily on the ground and spend most of their lives in the air, living on the insects they catch in their beaks.

These swifts are resident breeders in hill forests in southern Asia from India east to Indonesia and the Philippines.

They build their nests in rock crevices in cliffs, laying 3-5 eggs. The flight is impressively fast, even compared to other swifts.

The brown-backed needletail is a very large swift, and at 23 cm is bigger than the Alpine swift and the white-throated needletail. It has a similar build to the latter species, with a heavy barrel-like body. They are dark brown except for a white undertail, which extends on to the flanks.

The Hirundapus needletailed swifts get their name from the spined ends of their tail, which is not forked as in the Apus typical swifts.

References

 Birds of India by Grimmett, Inskipp and Inskipp, 

brown-backed needletail
Birds of South India
Birds of Sri Lanka
Birds of Southeast Asia
brown-backed needletail